Lorenzo Frutos (born  4 June 1989) is a Paraguayan footballer who last played for Keşla in the Azerbaijan Premier League.

Club career
On 8 August 2019, Keşla FK announced the signing of Frutos on a one-year contract.

Career statistics

Club

References

1989 births
Living people
Paraguayan footballers
Association football forwards
Azerbaijan Premier League players
Shamakhi FK players
Expatriate footballers in Azerbaijan
Paraguayan expatriate sportspeople in Azerbaijan